Dirty Harry is an American neo-noir vigilante action thriller film series featuring San Francisco Police Department Homicide Division Inspector "Dirty" Harry Callahan. There are five films: Dirty Harry (1971), Magnum Force (1973), The Enforcer (1976), Sudden Impact (1983) and The Dead Pool (1988). Clint Eastwood portrayed Callahan in all five films and directed Sudden Impact.

Callahan is notorious for his unorthodox, violent and ruthless methods against the criminals and killers he is assigned to apprehend. At the same time, he is assigned a partner who is usually either killed or seriously injured during the film.

Films

Dirty Harry (1971)

Dirty Harry (1971) was directed by Don Siegel and starred Clint Eastwood as Harry Callahan.  Harry tracks serial killer Scorpio (loosely based on the Zodiac killer). Eastwood's iconic portrayal of the blunt-speaking, unorthodox detective set the style for a number of his subsequent roles, and its box-office success led to the production of four sequels. The "alienated cop" motif was subsequently imitated by a number of other films.  At the beginning  of the film, Callahan corners a bank robber and says, "You've got to ask yourself a question: 'Do I feel lucky?'. Well, do ya, punk?". The line became famous, although often misquoted as "Do you feel lucky, punk?"; the second movie, Magnum Force, opens with Harry asking, "Do you feel lucky?"

It was the fourth-highest-grossing film of 1971 after Fiddler on the Roof, The French Connection, and Diamonds Are Forever.

Magnum Force (1973)

Magnum Force (1973) was directed by Ted Post. The main theme of this film is vigilante justice, and the plot revolves around a group of renegade traffic cops who are executing criminals who have avoided conviction in court. Despite Harry's penchant for strong-arm methods, he does not tolerate coldblooded murder of the accused and resolves to stop the killers. In this film, Harry's catch-phrase is "A good man's got to know his limitations".

The Enforcer (1976)

The Enforcer (1976) was directed by James Fargo. In this film, Harry is teamed with a female partner with no field experience (in 1976, American women had only recently been allowed to fill patrol and investigative assignments in most police bureaus), Inspector Kate Moore (Tyne Daly), as they take on a terrorist ring calling themselves the People's Revolutionary Strike Force. Harry opposes introducing inexperienced officers to the dangers of police work, whether male or female, and sees the homicide division as too dangerous for his new partner, who worked until recently in the  personnel department. Though Moore starts out overenthusiastic, she soon proves herself valuable to Harry, and matures quickly, earning Harry's respect in the process.

Sudden Impact (1983)

Sudden Impact (1983) was directed by Clint Eastwood.  Aging, but still bitter, Callahan is sent to a small town to follow up a lead in a murder case, which leads him directly to a rape victim who is out to avenge herself and her catatonic sister by killing the people who sexually assaulted them.  The film is notable for Callahan's catchphrase, "Go ahead, make my day".

The Dead Pool (1988)

The Dead Pool (1988) was directed by Buddy Van Horn.  Harry finds that he is among the subjects of a dead pool, a game betting on deaths of celebrities.  Someone tries to rig the game by killing the celebrities on one player's list.  Harry's catch phrase in this movie was "You're shit out of luck".

After this film, Eastwood retired from playing the Dirty Harry character, as he felt his age (58 in 1988) would make Harry a parody.

Cast and crew

Cast

Reception

Critical and public response

Influence on other productions

Sin City: That Yellow Bastard

Frank Miller, creator of the Sin City graphic novels, revealed in an interview that he created the Sin City story-arc That Yellow Bastard out of his dislike of The Dead Pool. Miller said: "When I went to see the last Dirty Harry movie, The Dead Pool, I was disgusted. I went out and said, this is not a Dirty Harry movie, this is nothing, this is a pale sequel." and I also said, "that's not the last Dirty Harry story, I will show you the last Dirty Harry story." Another character in That Yellow Bastard story is Nancy Callahan, named after Harry Callahan.

Bruce Willis played Hartigan, the "Dirty Harry of the story", in the Sin City (2005) film.

The Protector

This 1985 film featuring Jackie Chan was Chan's second American feature film. The movie was noted for being similar to the Dirty Harry series, with inspiration taken from there by director James Glickenhaus.

The Rookie

Directed by and co-starring Clint Eastwood; the film features an aging, tough cop who partners with a rookie cop, played by Charlie Sheen. Upon the film's release critics and audiences noted the similarities between Eastwood's two characters.

Gran Torino

Eastwood returned to acting after a four-year self-imposed hiatus in this 2008 film, which he also directed, produced, and partly scored with his son Kyle and Jamie Cullum. Eastwood plays Walt Kowalski, a recently widowed Korean War veteran alienated from his family and angry at the world. Walt's young neighbor, Thao Vang Lor, is pressured into stealing Walt's prized 1972 Ford Gran Torino by his cousin for his initiation into a gang. Walt thwarts the theft and subsequently develops a relationship with the boy and his family.

Biographer Marc Eliot called Eastwood's role "an amalgam of the Man with No Name, Dirty Harry, and William Munny, here, aged and cynical, but willing and able to fight on whenever the need arose". Manohla Dargis compared Eastwood's presence on film to Dirty Harry and the Man with No Name, stating, "Dirty Harry is back, in a way, in Gran Torino, not as a character but as a ghostly presence. He hovers in the film, in its themes and high-caliber imagery, and of course, most obviously in Mr. Eastwood's face. It is a monumental face now, so puckered and pleated that it no longer looks merely weathered, as it has for decades, but seems closer to petrified wood."

Tania Modleski, author of Clint Eastwood and Male Weepies, said, "[f]or many reviewers, Gran Torino represents the final step in Eastwood's repudiation of the Dirty Harry persona. If Unforgiven ends up being equivocal in its attitude toward violence and vigilantism, Gran Torino appears to accept the impotence of the lone, avenging hero" and that the impotence "is perhaps underlined by Walt's repeated gesture of pointing his finger at villains as if it were a gun." Amy Biancolli of the Houston Chronicle said that though Walt, an "old fart", does not have the same name as Dirty Harry, "there's no mistaking the rasp in his voice or the uncompromising crankiness of his Weltanschauung." Tom Charity of CNN said of Walt, "Like other Eastwood heroes before him, Walt sacrifices his independence by accepting that others depend on him." John Serba of The Grand Rapids Press said that Walt, who is "bitter, hopelessly cranky," "shares a sense of moral certainty" with Callahan, but that Walt "is infused with the wisdom and weariness" that Callahan does not have.

Home media
Warner Home Video owns rights to the Dirty Harry series. The five films have been remastered for DVD three times — in 1998, 2001 and 2008. They have been packaged in several DVD box sets. The Dirty Harry films made their high-definition debuts with the 2008 Blu-ray discs. Warner's marketing plan calls for only "The Dead Pool" film to be available as a separate Blu-ray, requiring fans who want the other four movies in high definition to buy the box set. In 2010 all five movies were released as a Blu-ray box set, "Clint Eastwood Dirty Harry Collection".

Other media

Novels

In the early 1980s, Warner Books published twelve books, authored under the pseudonym Dane Hartman, that further the adventures of Dirty Harry. The novels were later translated into French in the 1990s, as the Collection Supercops.

Video games

In 1995 Williams Electronic Games (WMS) created a Dirty Harry pinball machine, inspired by the 1971 film. 4,248 units were manufactured. Notable features include a gun handle shooter, a moving cannon used to shoot playfield targets and custom audio callouts recorded by Clint Eastwood. Game modes, sounds and dot matrix animations reflect events in the film, such as a car chase, barroom brawl, defusing bombs and "Feel Lucky" mode.

Dirty Harry: The War Against Drugs is a 1990 video game based on Dirty Harry film series. It incorporates several references to the film series.

Dirty Harry, originally scheduled for a 2007 release, is a canceled video game by The Collective based on the 1971 film of the same name.

References

External links
Dirty Harry filming locations
San Francisco in Cinema: Dirty Harry
The Best Dirty Harry Movies from American Movie Classics

Film series introduced in 1971
 
Action film series
American police detective films
Warner Bros. Pictures franchises
American vigilante films
1970s English-language films
1980s English-language films